The Family Party of Germany is a minor conservative political party in Germany. It has elected members to several local councils in the state of Saarland. In the 2005 federal elections, the Family Party received 0.4% of the popular vote and no seats. The party wants to introduce a right to vote for children carried out by the legal guardians.

In the 2014 European parliament elections, the Family Party received 0.69% of the national vote (202,871 votes in total) and elected one Member of the European Parliament - Arne Gericke, however he later went on to join Freie Wähler in June 2017. In the 2019 European Parliament election, the Family Party slightly increased their vote share, reaching the threshold and electing lead candidate Helmut Geuking as an MEP.

Election results

Federal Parliament (Bundestag)

European Parliament

References

External links
 www.familien-partei.de 

European Conservatives and Reformists member parties
Christian democratic parties in Europe
Conservative parties in Germany
Political parties established in 1981
1981 establishments in West Germany
Parties represented in the European Parliament
Social conservative parties
Family in Germany
European Christian Political Movement